Reverendus Pater Jean Xavier Hyacinthe Montrouzier (3 December 1820 – 6 May 1897)
was a French Marist priest, explorer, botanist, zoologist and entomologist.
Abbé Montrouzier studied the flora and fauna of Melanesia especially New Caledonia.

Works
Montrouzier, P. 1855. Essai sur la faune de l'île de Woodlark ou Mouiou. Annales de la Société d'Agriculture de Lyon 2 7: 1–114

Honours
Plants named for him include 
the genus Montrouziera "houp" (Clusiaceae)
(Euphorbiaceae) Phyllanthus montrouzieri Guillaumin & Guillaumin
(Lecythidaceae) Barringtonia montrouzieri Vieill.
(Meliaceae) Aglaia montrouzieri Pierre ex Pellegr.

Animals named for him include 
Papilio montrouzieri, Montrouzier's Ulysses, a swallowtail butterfly.
The mealybug Cryptolaemus montrouzieri

References

Laracy, HM. 1973. Xavier Montrouzier: a missionary in Melanesia. In Davidson, J.W. and D. Scarr (eds), Pacific Islands Portraits. Canberra, Australian National University Press, 127-145
Patrick O’Reilly Un missionnaire naturaliste : Xavier Montrouzier (1820–1897)''  Patrick O'Reilly Besançon : Imprimerie catholique de l'est, 1931]  [23 page Extract from Revue d'Historie des Missions, March 1931]

French explorers
French zoologists
1820 births
1897 deaths
French entomologists
French taxonomists
19th-century French Roman Catholic priests
19th-century French botanists
19th-century French zoologists